Bolkow may refer to:

Bölkow, a German aircraft manufacturer based in Stuttgart
Bolków (formerly German Bolkenhain), a town in south-west Poland
Bolków, Łódź Voivodeship, a village in central Poland